Wenshu Temple, also known as Guang'an Temple is a Buddhist temple located at the foot of Mount Wutai, in Taihuai Town of Wutai County, Shanxi, China. It is one of the five residence of Changkya Khutukhtu.

History
The temple was first established in the Qianlong period (1736–1795) of the Qing dynasty (1644–1911). The modern temple was completed in 1821 during the reign of Daoguang Emperor.

On September 19, 2016, the newly established Mahavira Hall was consecrated by eminent Buddhist masters of the Buddhist Association of Mount Wutai.

Architecture

Main Hall
The Main Hall enshrining the statues of Tsongkhapa and Guanyin. Guanyin has ten small heads, hence the name "Ten Head Guanyin". Statues of Manjushri, Guanyin and Vajrapani are placed at the back of the hall. On the walls are paintings with stories of Xuanzang went west for sutras and the 500 Arhats.

References

Buddhist temples on Mount Wutai
Buildings and structures in Xinzhou
Tourist attractions in Xinzhou
1821 establishments in China
19th-century Buddhist temples
Religious buildings and structures completed in 1821